The Pennyland project was one of a series of low-energy building experiments sparked by the 1973 oil crisis. It involved the construction of an estate of 177 houses in the Pennyland area of Milton Keynes, Buckinghamshire, United Kingdom. It compared possible future UK building efficiency standards with newly introduced Danish ones.

Although identical externally, half the Pennyland houses (Area 1) were built to the proposed 1982 UK Building Regulations energy efficiency standards. The other half (Area 2) were built to the much more demanding 1977 Danish BR77 standard. (In Europe, BR77 and the Swedish SBN-80 standards set the benchmark for low-energy housing at the time.)

Sponsored by the UK Department of Energy, Department of Environment and Milton Keynes Development Corporation, and using the technical expertise of the Open University Energy Research Group, the houses were constructed during 1979 and 1980.

For comparison, two additional groups of control houses, already built in 1978, were studied on an adjoining site at Neath Hill. A further group, the Linford low energy houses were built to the Pennyland Area 2 standards and used for more detailed tests.

Design
The Pennyland estate was laid out to take advantage of solar gain. The majority of houses faced south with the main living rooms located on the south side. They were designed with an insulated cavity wall with a poured concrete inner leaf to provide thermal mass. This had the added benefit of increasing airtightness. Nearly all were fitted with conventional radiator central heating systems.

Several levels of insulation, heating system efficiency and passive solar design were compared:

At Neath Hill most houses featured 
conventional 'heavyweight' gas boilers
50 mm roof insulation
no cavity wall insulation
Single glazing
No floor edge insulation
No special passive solar measures

About 20 of the Neath Hill houses were retrofitted with foam cavity fill wall insulation.

The Pennyland Area 1 houses featured:
low thermal capacity gas boilers
80 mm loft insulation
50 mm cavity wall insulation
Single glazing
No floor edge insulation
Passive solar layout and features

The Pennyland Area 2 houses (almost Danish BR77 standards) featured:
low thermal capacity gas boilers
150 mm loft insulation
100 mm cavity wall insulation
Double glazing
25 mm insulation under the edge of the floor slab
Passive solar layout and features

Lessons learned
The houses were monitored over the winters of 1981 and 1982 with energy and internal temperatures being measured in a large sample of houses on a weekly average basis. More detailed monitoring on an hourly basis was carried out on the Linford houses.

Among the lessons learned were:
Overall, the Pennyland Area 2 houses demonstrated a halving in gas consumption for space and water heating compared to the 'normal' Neath Hill houses.
The low thermal capacity gas boilers showed large energy savings compared to the conventional 'heavyweight' type.
The poured concrete construction used at Pennyland made the houses extremely airtight.
The overall package of energy conservation measures had a payback time of only four years.
The passive solar features were popular, but the energy savings were modest, and their use constrained estate layout. The savings were limited by the use of net curtains and privacy considerations.
The Pennyland houses suffered from minor mould growth in kitchens and bathrooms, a downside of the good airtightness.

Impact
The short payback times encouraged Milton Keynes Development Corporation to introduce its own Building Regulation standards for new housing within the city leading to the major 1986 Energy World demonstration project and exhibition.

The issue of mould growth in air-tight houses has since been tackled by Building Regulation requirements for specific ventilation in kitchens, bathrooms and toilets.

The levels of insulation tested at Pennyland and Great Linford in the early 1980s were only surpassed in the UK Building Regulation requirements in 2002.

See also
Energy World
Energy efficiency in British housing
Energy use and conservation in the United Kingdom
Sustainable development
Energy conservation
Passivhaus low-energy building standard
:Category:Low-energy building

References
The Pennyland project report, J Chapman, R Lowe & R Everett (1985); Open University Energy Research Group, Summary and Main report
Social survey – Pennyland residents; S Meikle; Milton Keynes Development Corporation
Linford Low Energy Houses, R Everett, A Horton and J Doggart (1985); Open University Energy Research Group, Summary and Main report

External links
 Energy Projects in Milton Keynes, Fuller, S.; Doggart, J. and Everett, R. (1982) MKDC
Energy efficiency in Danish housing
York Energy Demonstration Project
Association for Environment Conscious Building

Low-energy building in the United Kingdom
Solar architecture
History of Milton Keynes